Joseph Robyn (1884 – 27 February 1931) was a Belgian footballer. He played in four matches for the Belgium national football team from 1907 to 1912.

References

External links
 

1884 births
1931 deaths
Belgian footballers
Belgium international footballers
Place of birth missing
Association football defenders
R. Daring Club Molenbeek players